The Seville Heritage Park was once an Amer-Indian Taino village, 16th-century Spanish colonial settlement and a 17th-century British plantation, located in what is now Saint Ann Parish, Jamaica.

Site description
Prominent features of the park include:
 Governor's Castle 
 Spanish Sugar Mill
 Artesian Workshop
 Spanish Settlement 
 Spanish Church
 British Great House

World Heritage Status
This site was added to the UNESCO World Heritage Tentative List on March 2, 2009, in the Cultural category.

References

Indigenous peoples of the Caribbean
Jamaican culture
Saint Ann Parish
Taíno